Jordan Sloan (born 3 August 1993) is an Irish swimmer. He competed in the men's 100 metre freestyle event at the 2017 World Aquatics Championships.

References

External links
 

1993 births
Living people
Irish male freestyle swimmers
Commonwealth Games competitors for Northern Ireland
Swimmers at the 2018 Commonwealth Games
Place of birth missing (living people)
20th-century Irish people
21st-century Irish people